David McWane (born November 18, 1976) is an American musician, writer, and filmmaker, best known as the lead singer of Boston-based ska punk band Big D and the Kids Table. He has published several books of poetry and has written short stories and screenplays that are public on his website.

References

1976 births
American ska singers
Living people
21st-century American singers